Nanxi District is a district of the city of Yibin, Sichuan province, People's Republic of China. Nanxi was known as Nanxi County until 28 July 2011, when it was upgraded to Nanxi District.

Climate

References

Counties and districts of Yibin